Podlužje is a small geographical region in Serbia. It is located in south-eastern Syrmia. The western part of Podlužje belong to the autonomous province of Vojvodina, and the eastern part belongs to the city of Belgrade. The Serbian Orthodox Fenek monastery and natural reserve Obedska Pond are situated in this region, as well as the medieval town of Kupinik (today a village named Kupinovo), the former seat of the Serbian despots in Syrmia.

See also
Syrmia

Geographical regions of Serbia
Geography of Vojvodina
Syrmia
Geography of Belgrade